"Loco in Acapulco" is a song by the Four Tops, released as a single in 1988. It was written and produced by Phil Collins (who played drums on the track) and Lamont Dozier (one third of the group's legendary Motown long-time songwriting team, Holland–Dozier–Holland), for the soundtrack to the film Buster, that also starred Collins in the title role.

It was released on Arista Records and became an international hit, reaching number 7 in the UK charts, and number 9 in the Netherlands. The song did not chart in the U.S., as it was issued as the B-side to "Change of Heart", when it was released as a single in the US during 1989. The song is about partying and having fun in the Mexican city of Acapulco. The song would subsequently appear on their 1988 studio album Indestructible.

Charts

Certifications

Personnel
Lead vocals - Levi Stubbs
Backing vocals – Renaldo Benson, Abdul Fakir, Lawrence Payton, Phil Collins 
Guitar – David Williams, Michael Landau, Paul Jackson Jr.
Keyboards – Aaron Zigman
Bass – Freddie Washington
Drums, co-songwriting, co-production – Phil Collins

References

External links
 The Four Tops performing "Loco in Acapulco" on Top of the Pops (YouTube)

1988 singles
Four Tops songs
Songs written by Phil Collins
Songs written by Lamont Dozier
1988 songs
Arista Records singles
Song recordings produced by Lamont Dozier
Song recordings produced by Phil Collins
Songs written for films
Songs about Mexico
Acapulco